The Golden Melody Award for Best Female Mandarin Singer is a Golden Melody Award recognizing outstanding vocal performance by a female in the Mandopop category, the first of which was presented in 1991.

In 1990 an award called Best Female Singer was designed to honor all female solo performances in the pop category; In 1991 the award was separated into Best Mandarin Female Singer, Best Taiwanese Female Singer, Best Hakka Female Singer, and Best Aboriginal Female Singer.

The award has been won by Tanya Chua the most times, with four wins. A-Mei is the artist with the most nominations with fourteen.

Recipients

Category facts 
Most Wins in Category

Most nominations

Other facts
 A-Mei is the only artist to receive the six consecutive nominations in this category and she won for Truth among them.

See also

 List of music awards honoring women

References 

Golden Melody Awards
Music awards honoring women